The  was a "Rapid" limited-stop train service in Japan operated by the East Japan Railway Company (JR East) between  and  on the Shinetsu Main Line in Niigata Prefecture from 2002 until March 2015.

Service pattern
Services consisted of three trains in each direction daily.

Rolling stock
Services were formed of 6-car 485 series EMUs, which included Green car (first class) accommodation. Niigata-based sets T16 and T17 were normally allocated to Kubikino duties, as these two sets did not receive the Green car seat refurbishment applied to other 485 sets used on Inaho limited express services in 2007.

Formation
Trains were formed as shown below, with car 1 at the Arai end.

History
The Kubikino services commenced from the start of the revised timetable on 1 December 2002, replacing the previous Minori limited express services. 4-car 485 series were initially used on these services, but 6-car Inaho 485 series sets were used from 20 May 2006 to relieve overcrowding.

Kubikino services were discontinued from the start of the revised timetable on 14 March 2015, coinciding with the opening of the Hokuriku Shinkansen extension from Nagano to Kanazawa. Services were replaced by new Shirayuki limited express services operating between Niigata and Arai.

See also
 List of named passenger trains of Japan

References

Named passenger trains of Japan
East Japan Railway Company
Railway services introduced in 2002
2002 establishments in Japan
Railway services discontinued in 2015
2015 disestablishments in Japan
Rail transport in Niigata Prefecture